Go Mi-young, ( : March 3, 1967 – July 11, 2009) was a South Korean female mountaineer.

Together with the Korean mountaineer Jae-Soo Kim, she became one of the first climbers to summit three 8,000-metre peaks in a single season when they climbed Makalu, Kangchenjunga, and Dhaulagiri in six weeks. In 2007, she summited Everest.  On July 11, 2009, after reaching the top of Nanga Parbat, she fell off a cliff on the descent in bad weather and was later found dead.  At the time of her death, she was in the quest to become the first woman to scale the world's 14 highest peaks (the eight-thousanders), competing against the Korean climber Oh Eun-sun and Basque Spanish climber Edurne Pasaban, who later achieved this goal.

References

South Korean mountain climbers
South Korean summiters of Mount Everest
1967 births
2009 deaths
Mountaineering deaths
Accidental deaths in Pakistan